Suh Dae-sook (22 November 1931 – 13 September 2022) was North Korean professor emeritus of political science and a director of the Centre for Korean Studies at the University of Hawaii. He received his PhD from Columbia University in 1964 with a thesis Korean Communism and the rise of Kim.

He was best known for the books Kim Il Sung: The North Korean Leader, published by Columbia University Press and considered the best work on the early life of Kim Il-sung, and The Korean Communist Movement. His works have been published or translated in English, Korean, Russian, and German.

Publications
Dae-Sook Suh  Korean Communism and the rise of Kim Columbia University. 1964 
Dae-Sook Suh; Chae-Jin Lee. Political Leadership in Korea Seattle:University of Washington Press, 2014. According to WorldCat, the book is in 967 libraries.
Dae-Sook Suh; Chae-Jin Lee, eds. North Korea after Kim Il Sung Boulder, Colo: L. Rienner, 1996 
Dae-Sook Suh, ed. Korean Studies: new Pacific Currents. University of Hawaii, 1994   
Dae-Sook Suh  Kim Il Sung: the North Korean Leader  NY: Columbia Univ. Press, 1988/1995  
Dae-Sook Suh  Korean Communism 1945–1989 : a reference guide.  Univ. Hawaii Press. 1981 
Dae-Sook Suh  New directions of domestic policy in the Democratic People's Republic of Korea. Univ. Calif., 1995  Press. 1981 
Dae-Sook Suh  Koreans in the Soviet Union  Univ. Hawaii Press. 1987 
Dae-Sook Suh  The Korean Communist Movement 1918–1948. Princeton Univ. Press, 1967   
Dae-Sook Suh  Documents of Korean Communism, 1918–48 Princeton Univ. Press, 1970. Calif., 1995  Press. 1981

See also
 Communism in Korea
 Kim Il-sung

References

Citations

Sources
 

1931 births
2022 deaths
Columbia University alumni
University of Hawaiʻi faculty
Historians of Korea
South Korean political scientists